The X Factor Philippines is a Philippine music competition to find a new singing talent. The first season began on June 23, 2012. KC Concepcion is the host of the show, while the judging panel consist of Charice, Gary Valenciano, Pilita Corrales, and Martin Nievera.

The show is mainly based on the UK format. The competition consists of auditions, in front of the shows producers and then the judges with a live audience. It is then followed by the bootcamp, judges' home visit and then through the live finals, the winner of which receives a 4 million peso recording contract with Star Records.

The finals were held on October 7, 2012, and aired live from the PAGCOR Grand Theater in Parañaque, Metro Manila, with KZ Tandingan from Charice's category declared as the winner of the competition. On the other hand, Martin Nievera's Gabriel Maturan of his Boys category came in as runner-up, while Daddy's Home of Gary Valenciano's Group category came in third place.

The show ended on October 14, 2012, airing two special episodes after the finals.

Selection process

Auditions

Auditions started in October 2011. Initial auditions are held in cities, provinces and towns in the Philippines like Laoag, Vigan, La Union, Baguio, Cagayan, Isabela, Nueva Ecija, Pampanga, Tarlac, Zambales, Manila, Cavite, Occidental Mindoro, Palawan, Quezon, Albay, Camarines Norte, Camarines Sur, Masbate, Sorsogon, Marinduque, Aklan, Capiz, Iloilo, Negros Oriental, Leyte, Zamboanga del Norte, Zamboanga del Sur, Bukidnon, Misamis Occidental, General Santos, Koronadal, Lanao del Norte, Maguindanao, Agusan del Norte and Surigao del Norte.

Major auditions were held in key cities from different parts of the country such as Baguio, Dagupan, Batangas, Quezon City, Naga, Iloilo, Bacolod, Cebu, Cagayan de Oro and Davao. More than 20,000 people auditioned for the first season of The X Factor Philippines.

The auditions were aired from June 23, 2012 until July 15, 2012. Footage from the Visayas auditions were first aired during the first week, followed by the Luzon auditions, the NCR auditions, and lastly, the Mindanao auditions.

Bootcamp
The bootcamp stage was held at the PAGCOR Grand Theater in Parañaque, Metro Manila. The bootcamp stage was broadcast in two episodes on July 21 and 22. The first day of bootcamp saw the judges split the 172 hopeful acts into four groups, namely: the Boys (solo male acts from ages 16–25 yrs old), the Girls (solo female acts from ages 16–25 yrs old), the Over 25s (solo acts from ages 26 yrs old and above), and the Groups. All of the groups received vocal coaching from resident mentors, and each later performed one song. The Boys sang "Tuwing Umuulan at Kapiling Ka" by Basil Valdez; the Girls with "Without You" by David Guetta; the Over 25s with "It's My Life" by Bon Jovi; and the Groups with "Edge of Glory" by Lady Gaga.  At the end of the day, the number of acts was cut to 68. On the second day, acts were given dance coaching by resident dance coach, Joane Laygo. At noon, for the dance challenge, the judges announced that no one will be eliminated. The acts were given the last challenge, of which they will sing a song they personally picked. At the end of the day, 20 acts made it to the next round, while one group was formed, Lucky Girls, made up of 6 solo female acts that didn't make it through namely: Alyssa Quijano, Auriette Divina, Monique Lualhati, Katrina Velarde, Jhelsea Flores and Ashley Campbell.

Judges' home visit
The judges' home visit was the last stage of the selection process. The episodes were aired on July 28 and 29. During this stage, it was revealed that Nievera would mentor the Boys, Charice would mentor the Girls, Corrales would mentor the Over 25s, and Valenciano would mentor the Groups. The final selection process was aided by a guest judge per category. Journey lead vocalist Arnel Pineda joined Nievera at Club Balai Isabel in Batangas, former semi-finalist Cheesa from the second season of the US version of The Voice joined Charice at The Bellevue Hotel in Alabang, Muntinlupa, Rico J. Puno joined Corrales in Manila, and Jed Madela joined Valenciano at Tagaytay Highlands in Tagaytay. At judges' houses each act performed a song they personally picked and performed it in front of their mentor and his/her guest judge.

The eight acts failed to make the Top 12 and were eliminated:
Boys: Anton Paolo Antenorcruz, Michael Pangilinan
Girls: Abigail Mendoza, Angelica Prado
Over 25s: Paulo Castro, Cristine Ledesma
Groups: 5th Avids, Sweet Bliss

Contestants 
The top 12 contestants were confirmed as follows;

Key:
 – Winner
 – Runner-up
 – Third place

Live shows

The live shows began on August 4, 2012 in PAGCOR Grand Theater in Parañaque, Metro Manila. Each week, the top acts performances took place on Saturday nights, while the results are announced during Sunday nights. Each week has a different set of theme. Often during results nights, guests are invited live to perform; while the remaining acts during results nights also feature group performances.

Sam Milby performed during the first results night, with special numbers from Gary Valenciano's children Paolo and Kiana Valenciano, and former X Factor auditionees' West Track Boys and Rodrigo Lozon. During the end of the second performance night, it was announced that Xian Lim, Kean Cipriano, and Tutti Caringal would perform in the second results night. However, during the airing of the results night, the three did not appear for due to unknown reasons. Jovit Baldivino and Yeng Constantino performed during the third results night and gave a special birthday tribute to Pilita Corrales; while Star Power's grand champion, Angeline Quinto, performed on the fourth results night. Pepe Smith, the living legend of Pinoy rock, performed on the fifth results night. While Dingdong Avanzado, Gino Padilla, and Randy Santiago, three of the most famous OPM 80s icons, performed on the sixth results night. In the seventh performance night, L.A. Dancers, an American dance group, made a special dance number from the song of Rihanna's "Where Have You Been" during the start of the show. During the seventh results night, pinoy band vocalists' Kean Cipriano, Ney Dimaculangan, and Tutti Caringal joined the remaining 6 acts in a tribute production number to pinoy rock band icons, the Eraserheads and Rivermaya. Richard Poon, Duncan Ramos, and Aiza Seguerra performed an opening number during the eighth performance night; while Khalil Ramos and Daniel Padilla, two of the main casts of the Princess and I, serenade the audiences during the eighth results night. On the ninth performance night, Toni Gonzaga performed an opening number, and was followed by Pilipinas Got Talent's El Gamma Penumbra who performed a shadow theatrical routine midway during the show.

The Live finals were held on October 6 & 7, 2012, at the PAGCOR Grand Theater in Parañaque, Metro Manila. In the final performance night, Lani Misalucha graced and opened the show singing her own rendition of Dynamite, a song popularized by Taio Cruz. Vina Morales, winner of Ikon ASEAN 2007, performed a medley of songs of Jennifer Lopez midway during the show. While Nina, Rico J. Puno, and Bamboo Mañalac had a duet with Daddy's Home, KZ Tandingan, and Gabriel Maturan respectively.

In the final results night, KC Concepcion opened the show, singing Nicole Scherzinger's song called Wet. ASAP's Champions' Erik Santos, Jed Madela, Jovit Baldivino, and Angeline Quinto performed a special number with the Top 3 acts. Pooh, April Boy Regino, and K Brosas had a special song number with former acts, Kedebon Colim, and Modesto Taran, and former auditionee Osang respectively. Yeng Constantino performed a number with the Top 5 acts. Also, The X Factor Philippines Top 12 acts sang "Bro, Ikaw ang Star ng Pasko", the Christmas Station ID theme song of ABS-CBN in 2009 and part of the recently released The X Factor Philippines album in iTunes Philippines. Also, the mentor-judges' Charice, Gary Valenciano, Martin Nievera, and Pilita Corrales performed a special number singing one of their famous songs.

Results summary
Color key

Notes

  Nievera was not required to vote because there was already a majority.
^  Charice was not required to vote because there was already a majority.

Live show details

Week 1 (August 4 & 5)
 Theme: Songs from foreign and local movies
 Celebrity performer: Sam Milby
 Special guest performers: "Sana Maulit Muli" (performed by Paolo and Kiana Valenciano); "Hataw Na" and "Di Bale Nalang" (performed by West Track Boys & Rodrigo Lozon) - special tribute to Gary Valenciano
 Group performance: "Call Me Maybe" with Sam Milby
Lucky Girls' new name 'A.K.A. Jam' took effect from week 1.

Judges' vote to eliminate
 Charice: Joan Da – backed her own act, Jerrianne Templo
 Corrales: Jerrianne Templo – backed her own act, Joan Da
 Nievera: Jerriane Templo – gave no reason
 Valenciano: Jerrianne Templo – gave no reason

Week 2 (August 11 & 12)
 Theme: Songs with life or buhay in the title
 Group performance: "Overdrive" and "Pare Ko"

Judges' vote to eliminate
 Corrales: Takeoff – backed her own act, Mark Mabasa
 Valenciano: Mark Mabasa – backed his own act, Takeoff
 Nievera: Takeoff – went with his gut feeling
 Charice: Mark Mabasa – couldn't make the decision on her own so put the decision to deadlock

With the judges deadlocked, Mark Mabasa was eliminated as the act with the fewest public vote.

Week 3 (August 18 & 19)
 Theme: Rock music
 Musical guest: Jovit Baldivino, Yeng Constantino
 Group performance: "The Candy Man" with Jovit Baldivino; "I Saw Her Standing There" with Yeng Constantino

Judges' vote to eliminate
 Charice: Daddy's Home – gave no reason
 Corrales: A.K.A Jam – gave no reason
 Nievera: Daddy's Home – gave no reason
 Valenciano: A.K.A. Jam – gave no reason

With the judges deadlocked, A.K.A. Jam was eliminated as the act with the fewest public vote.

Week 4 (August 25 & 26)
 Theme: Tribute to late music icons
 Musical guest: Angeline Quinto ("Don't Know What To Say")
 Group performance: "Kawawang Cowboy" ; TBA with Angeline Quinto

Judges' vote to eliminate
 Valenciano: Modesto Taran – backed his own act, Takeoff
 Corrales: Modesto Taran – felt that Modesto Taran needed to be with his family
 Charice: Modesto Taran – felt that Modesto Taran needed to be with his family
 Nievera: was not required to vote since there was already a majority

Week 5 (September 1 & 2)
 Theme: OPM songs
 Musical guest: Pepe Smith ("Titser's Enemi No.1")
 Group performance: "Mga Kababayan Ko"; mashup songs of "Salidumay", and "Urong Sulong" ; "Rock Baby, Rock" ; "Balong Malalim" with Pepe Smith

Judges' vote to eliminate
 Valenciano: Joan Da – Backed his own act, Takeoff
 Corrales: Takeoff – backed her own act, Joan Da
 Nievera: Joan Da – gave no reason
 Charice: Takeoff – backed the act with the least bottom two history, Joan Da

With the judges deadlocked, Takeoff was eliminated as the act with the fewest public vote.

Week 6 (September 8 & 9)
 Theme: Songs from the 1980s
 Celebrity performers: Dingdong Avanzado, Gino Padilla, Randy Santiago
 Group performance: "Wake Me Up Before You Go-Go" with Dingdong Avanzado; "Boys Don't Cry" with Gino Padilla; "Gold" with Randy Santiago; "I'm So Excited" with Dingdong Avanzado, Gino Padilla, and Randy Santiago

Judges' vote to eliminate
 Charice: Joan Da – backed her own act, Allen Sta. Maria
 Corrales: Allen Sta. Maria – backed her own act, Joan Da
 Valenciano: Joan Da – gave no reason
 Nievera: Joan Da – Based on the final showdown performance

Week 7 (September 15 & 16)
 Theme: Songs by Eraserheads and Rivermaya
 Musical guest: Kean Cipriano, Ney Dimaculangan, Tutti Caringal
 Special guest performers: special dance number from L.A. Dancers
 Group performance: "Alapaap" with Tutti Caringal; "Elisi" with Ney Dimaculangan; "Magasin" with Kean Cipriano; "Awit Ng Kabataan" with Kean Cipriano, Ney Dimaculangan, and Tutti Caringal

Judges' vote to eliminate
 Corrales: Kedebon Colim – based her vote on who performed least during the final showdown
 Valenciano: Kedebon Colim – backed his own act, Daddy's Home
 Nievera: Kedebon Colim – felt that the other judges will also send him home
 Charice: was not required to vote since there was already a majority

Week 8 (September 22 & 23)
Theme: Revival songs
Celebrity performers: Richard Poon, Duncan Ramos, Aiza Seguerra, Khalil Ramos ("Kung Ako Ba Siya"), Daniel Padilla ("Prinsesa")
Group performance: "Crazy Little Thing Called Love" with Richard Poon, "Kiss" with Duncan Ramos, "Sweet Child o' Mine" with Aiza Seguerra (on the performance night);

Judges' vote to eliminate
 Corrales: Daddy's Home – gave no reason
 Valenciano: Jeric Medina – backed his own act, Daddy's Home
 Nievera: Daddy's Home – backed his own act, Jeric Medina.
 Charice: Jeric Medina – based her vote with the act that has least potential and has a less spot in the industry.

With the judges deadlocked, Jeric Medina was eliminated as the act with the fewest public vote.

Week 9 (September 29 & 30)
Theme: Songs from musical heroes
Celebrity performers: Toni Gonzaga ("Lady Marmalade"); Pilipinas Got Talent's El Gamma Penumbra performed a shadow theatrical routine based from ABS-CBN's I Choose Philippines "Piliin Ang Pilipinas" tourism campaign

Judges' vote to eliminate
 Nievera: Allen Sta. Maria – felt that she had less X factor than KZ
 Corrales: Allen Sta. Maria – felt that even if she goes home, she is already a star
 Valenciano: Allen Sta. Maria – felt that KZ has the global reach
 Charice: was not required to vote since there was a majority

Week 10: Finals (October 6 & 7)
October 6
 Themes: Contestant's choice; Celebrity duets
 Celebrity performers: Lani Misalucha performed "Raise Your Glass"; Vina Morales performed a medley of "Goin' In", I'm Into You" and "On the Floor"
 Group performance: "Dynamite" with Lani Misalucha

October 7
 Theme: Mentor duets
 Celebrity performers: KC Concepcion ("Wet"); Pooh and Kedebon Colim ("Para Sa'Yo Ang Laban Na 'To"); April Boy Regino and Modesto Taran ("Paano ang Puso Ko"); K Brosas and Osang ("No More Tears (Enough Is Enough)"); Yeng Constantino with the Top 5 acts
 Group performance: "Try It on My Own" with Erik Santos; "This Is My Now" with Jed Madela; "Win" with Jovit Baldivino; "The Climb" with Angeline Quinto, Jed Madela, Erik Santos, and Jovit Baldivino; "Bro, Ikaw ang Star ng Pasko"
 Mentors' performance: Charice ("Pyramid"); Gary Valenciano ("Hataw Na"); Martin Nievera ("This Is the Moment"); Pilita Corrales ("If I Never Sing Another Song") together with Charice, Gary Nievera, and Gary Valenciano
 Grand winner's performance: KZ Tandingan ("Superstar")

Television ratings
Television ratings for the first season of The X Factor Philippines on ABS-CBN are gathered from two major sources, namely from AGB Nielsen and Kantar Media. AGB Nielsen's survey ratings are gathered from Mega Manila households, while Kantar Media's survey ratings are gathered from all over the Philippines' urban and rural households.

Color keys
 Highest rating during the season
 Lowest rating during the season

Music

The X Factor Philippines Album

The X Factor Philippines album is the first compilation album by The X Factor Philippines Season 1 finalists. It was released digitally in iTunes Philippines by Star Records on October 6, 2012. The album is composed of 13 tracks.

On October 9, 2012, two days after being crowned as the grand winner, KZ Tandingan's own rendition of "Killing Me Softly" became number 1 on the Philippines iTunes chart toppling the K-pop viral single of Psy's "Gangnam Style" to number 2. Daddy's Home rendition of Whitney Houston's "All at Once" also came in number 3 beating the newly released single, "Skyfall" by Adele. "Star ng Pasko" also made it to the charts at number 7.

A CD recorded version of the album was released on November 7, 2012, and was officially launched on November 12, 2012 at Eastwood City in Libis, Quezon City.

Track listing

See also
List of programs broadcast by ABS-CBN Corporation
The X Factor

References

External links
Official Website
The X Factor Philippines on Facebook
The X Factor Philippines on Twitter
The X Factor Philippines on YouTube

Philippines 01
2012 Philippine television seasons
Season 1